Fornasini is a surname of Italian origin, particularly associated with the city of Bologna. People with that name include:

 Carlo Antonio Fornasini (1802/18051865), Italian ivory trader in Mozambique, amateur field naturalist
 Carlo Fornasini (1854–1931), micropalaeontologist
 Giovanni Fornasini (1915–1944), Italian priest, Gold Medal of Military Valour, Blessed

Surnames of Italian origin